The Swedish Hockey Hall of Fame was created 2011 to honor those individuals who have contributed to Swedish ice hockey.

The Hall of Fame includes notable players, coaches, referees and other personalities.  The first inductees were honored in 2011 and are recorded with an inductee number. Currently (2018) there are 120 inductees in the hall of fame. Some election is by voting open to the public.

Swedish Hockey Hall of Fame is independent of the International Ice Hockey Federation Hockey Hall of Fame, but operated with similar structure and regulatory framework.

Inductees

1. Sven Tumba - Elected November 12, 2011
2. Lars Björn - Elected February 9, 2012
3. Börje Salming - Elected February 9, 2012
4. Anders Hedberg - Elected February 11, 2012
5. Håkan Loob - Voted February 11, 2012
6. Ulf Sterner - Elected February 10, 2012
7. Leif Holmqvist - Elected February 10, 2012
8. Roland Stoltz - Elected February 10, 2012
9. Nisse Nilsson - Elected February 10, 2012
10. Mats Näslund - Voted February 10, 2012
11. Peter Lindmark - Voted May 1, 2012
12. Raoul Le Mat - Elected May 17, 2012
13. Carl Abrahamsson - Elected May 17, 2012
14. Sigfrid Öberg - Elected May 17, 2012
15. Anton Johanson - Elected May 17, 2012
16. Arne Johansson - Elected May 17, 2012
17. Kurt Kjellström - Elected May 17, 2012
18. Hans Georgii - Elected May 17, 2012
19. Gustaf Johansson - Elected May 17, 2012
20. Lennart Svedberg - Elected May 17, 2012
21. Nils Molander - Elected May 17, 2012
22. Einar Lundell - Elected May 17, 2012
23. Ragnar Backström - Elected May 17, 2012
24. Helge Berglund - Elected May 17, 2012
25. Åke Andersson - Elected May 17, 2012
26. Folke Jansson - Elected May 17, 2012
27. Erik Burman - Elected May 17, 2012
28. Rudolf Eklöw - Elected May 17, 2012
29. Lars-Erik Sjöberg - Elected May 17, 2012
30. Arne Strömberg - Elected May 17, 2012
31. Thord Flodqvist - Elected May 17, 2012
32. Birger Holmqvist - Elected May 17, 2012
33. Anders Andersson - Elected May 17, 2012
34. Herman Carlson - Elected May 17, 2012
35. Erik Johansson - Elected May 17, 2012
36. Axel Sandö - Elected May 17, 2012
37. Sven Bergqvist - Elected May 17, 2012
38. Ove Dahlberg - Elected May 17, 2012
39. Gösta Johansson - Elected May 17, 2012
40. Gösta Ahlin - Elected May 17, 2012
41. Stig-Göran Johansson - Elected May 17, 2012
42. Sven Thunman - Elected May 17, 2012
43. Holger Nurmela - Elected May 17, 2012
44. Sigurd Bröms - Elected May 17, 2012
45. Hans Mild - Elected May 17, 2012
46. Hans Öberg - Elected May 17, 2012
47. Åke Lassas - Elected May 17, 2012
48. Håkan Wickberg - Elected May 17, 2012
49. Ronald Pettersson - Elected May 17, 2012
50. Lennart Johansson - Elected May 17, 2012
51. Eilert Määttä - Elected May 17, 2012
52. Lars-Eric Lundvall - Elected December 21, 2012 
53. Kjell Svensson - Elected January 21, 2013
54. Bert-Olov Nordlander - Elected October 29, 2012
55. Bo Tovland - Elected February 1, 2013
56. Tomas Jonsson - Voted March 3, 2013
57. Tomas Sandström - Elected February 21, 2013
58. Jörgen Jönsson - Voted December 18, 2012
59. Tommy Salo - Elected January 21, 2013 
60. Bengt-Åke Gustafsson - Elected October 29, 2012
61. Kent Nilsson 
62. Anders Carlsson 
63. Rickard Fagerlund 
64. Pelle Bergström 
65. Mats Sundin 
66. Peter Forsberg 
67. Tord Lundström 
68. Thomas Rundqvist 
69. Jonas Bergqvist 
70. Ulf Dahlén 
71. Eje Lindström 
72. Markus Näslund 
73. Mats Waltin 
74. Mats Åhlberg 
75. Dan Söderström 
76. Jan-Åke Edvinsson
77. Dag Olsson 
78. Ulf Lindgren 
79. Lars Tegnér 
80. Christer Höglund 
81. Viking Harbom 
82. Thure Wickberg 
83. Ruben Rundqvist
84. Georg Lundberg 
85. Pelle Lindbergh 
86. Arne Grunander
87. Börje Idenstedt 
88. Kjell Glennert
89. Curt Berglund 
90. Stig Nilsson 
91. Tommy Sandlin
92. Bo Berglund 
93. Carlabel Berglund 
94. Sven Nordstrand 
95. Folke Lindström 
96. Stefan Liv 
97. Peter Åslin 
98. Hans Svedberg
99. Calle Johansson 
100. Nicklas Lidström 
101. Erika Holst
102. Maria Rooth 
103. Gunilla Andersson
104. Hans Lindberg 
105. Nils Johansson 
106. Mikael Johansson
107. Ann-Louise Edstrand 
108. Anders Eldebrink 
109. Thommie Bergman 
110. Conny Evensson 
111. Gert Blomé 
112. Tommy Albelin 
113. Kristina Bergstrand
114. Ylva Martinsen 
115. Kenny Jönsson 
117. Annica Åhlén 
118. Tommy Samuelsson
119. Lars-Göran Nilsson 
120. Peter Andersson

See also
IIHF Hall of Fame

References

External links
Swedish Hockey Hall of Fame official website (in Swedish).

Ice hockey museums and halls of fame
Ice hockey in Sweden
Halls of fame in Sweden
2011 establishments in Sweden
Awards established in 2011